Kaghazi (also Romanized as Kāghaz̄ī and Kāghazī; also known as Khakūzā, Khakūzeh, and Mazra‘eh-ye Kāghazī) is a village in Kavir Rural District, Kavirat District, Aran va Bidgol County, Isfahan Province, Iran. At the 2006 census, its population was 1,490, in 408 families.

References 

Populated places in Aran va Bidgol County